Mark William Geiger (born August 25, 1974) is an American sports administrator and former soccer referee. He is the senior director of match officials at the Professional Referee Organization (PRO), which oversees domestic referees in Major League Soccer (MLS). Geiger previously officiated in MLS and was on the FIFA International Referees List from 2008 to 2019. At the international level, Geiger refereed the 2012 Olympics, the 2013, 2015, and 2017 CONCACAF Gold Cups, and the 2014 and 2018 FIFA World Cups. At the 2014 World Cup, he became the first referee from the United States to officiate a knockout match at a World Cup tournament. Before becoming a full-time referee, Geiger was a high school mathematics teacher.

Refereeing career
Geiger first took up refereeing in 1988. He became a United States Soccer Federation National Referee in 2003 and officiated in Major League Soccer from 2004 to 2018. He has officiated in CONCACAF tournaments since becoming a FIFA referee in 2008, and has officiated Gold Cup and other international tournaments and fixtures. Geiger was selected for the CONCACAF U-20 Championship in 2011, where he refereed the final.

Geiger officiated at the 2011 FIFA U-20 World Cup in Colombia. He officiated the Group E game between eventual tournament champions Brazil and Austria at Estadio Metropolitano Roberto Meléndez in Barranquilla. He then took charge of the Group B game between Uruguay and Cameroon at Estadio El Campín in Bogotá. He was appointed to the Round of 16 match between Spain and South Korea at Estadio Palogrande in Manizales. Finally, he refereed the Final with American Assistant Referee Sean Hurd and Canadian Assistant Referee Joe Fletcher, between Brazil and Portugal at Estadio El Campín in Bogotá. This was the first time a referee from the United States has ever officiated a major men's tournament final.

Geiger was selected as the Major League Soccer referee of the year for the 2011 season, and then again in 2014.

In 2012, Geiger was selected as one of 16 referees to officiate at the 2012 Summer Olympics in London. Geiger took charge of the Group D match between Spain vs. Japan and the quarterfinal between Japan vs. Egypt. In 2013, Geiger was an official at the 2013 CONCACAF Gold Cup.

Geiger was selected as CONCACAF's representative referee for the 2013 Club World Cup.

2014 FIFA World Cup
Geiger was one of 25 referees appointed for the 2014 FIFA World Cup in Brazil. Geiger described the assignment to the World Cup as "an immensely proud moment".
Geiger officiated the 2014 World Cup Group C match between Colombia and Greece at the Estadio Mineirão in Belo Horizonte;
the 2014 World Cup Group B match between Chile and Spain at the Maracanã Stadium in Rio de Janeiro;
and the 2014 World Cup Round of 16 match between France and Nigeria at the Estádio Nacional in Brasilia, the first American to referee in the knockout round of a FIFA World Cup.

2017 FIFA Confederations Cup
Geiger was selected to officiate the 2017 FIFA Confederations Cup in Russia. In the Group Stage, Geiger officiated the Group B match between Australia and Germany in Sochi as well as the Group A match between New Zealand and Portugal in Saint Petersburg.

2018 FIFA World Cup
Geiger was one of 36 referees selected for the 2018 FIFA World Cup, working with a North American crew of Joe Fletcher from Canada and Frank Anderson from the United States. Geiger served as referee on three matches at the tournament and was VAR in five matches.

Geiger's first assignment was the second group stage match of Group B between Portugal and Morocco. Geiger worked as the VAR In the match between Denmark and Australia. During the match he advised the referee, Antonio Mateu Lahoz, to review a possible handball in the penalty area. After review, Lahoz awarded a penalty kick that allowed the Socceroos to score and secure a 1–1 draw. He subsequently worked as VAR for the Group D match between Argentina and Iceland, the Group G match featuring Belgium and Tunisia and the Round of 16 contest between Uruguay and Portugal before his final assignment in the tournament's Third Place match.

Geiger then officiated the Group F third match between South Korea and Germany. South Korea defeated Germany 2–0, but neither team advanced since Sweden defeated Mexico. He then officiated at the Round of 16 game between Colombia and England. England advanced on penalties after a 1–1 draw. Geiger was selected as one of the final 12 referees on the shortlist to officiate the final or third place play-off match, and was ultimately selected to be VAR on the 3rd place match between Belgium and England.

Controversies 
Geiger has been criticized for making controversial calls, such as the 2015 Gold Cup semi final between Panama and Mexico, when he called a controversial penalty for Mexico with Panama up 1–0 in the 90th minute. He admitted to making mistakes in that match as well. Panamanian Football Federation president Pedro Chaluja said the match was "fixed", and he also wanted FIFA and CONCACAF to investigate.

Retirement

On January 9, 2019, Geiger announced that he would retire from refereeing and take up a position within PRO as its director of senior match officials.

FIFA World Cup record

Personal life
Geiger was born on August 25, 1974, and grew up in Beachwood, New Jersey. After studying teaching at Trenton State College, he became a mathematics teacher at Lacey Township High School in Lanoka Harbor, New Jersey, a role that he gave up to become a full-time referee. While at Lacey Township High School, Geiger was among 103 recipients of the Presidential Award for Excellence in Math and Science Teaching in 2010.

Honors
MLS Referee of the Year: 2011, 2014
 Morgan J. Hellebuyck North American Officials Award 2006

References

External links
 
 
 
 
 

1974 births
Living people
Schoolteachers from New Jersey
American soccer referees
Major League Soccer referees
Mathematics educators
North American Soccer League referees
People from Beachwood, New Jersey
Olympic football referees
Football referees at the 2012 Summer Olympics
CONCACAF Champions League referees
CONCACAF Gold Cup referees
2014 FIFA World Cup referees
2018 FIFA World Cup referees
Sportspeople from Ocean County, New Jersey
Copa América referees